St. Paul Street may refer to:

St. Paul Street (Baltimore) in Maryland, United States
St. Paul Street station (MBTA Green Line B branch) in Massachusetts, United States
St. Paul Street station (MBTA Green Line C branch), on the Green Line C branch
Rue Saint-Paul (Montreal) in Montreal, Quebec, Canada
A portion of Niagara Regional Road 81 in Saint Catharines, Ontario, Canada
 Rue Saint-Paul (Paris), in Paris, France

Odonyms referring to religion